Putri Ayu Silaen (born 24 May 1997), commonly known as Putri Ayu, is an Indonesian Soprano singer who previously dabbled in the pop genre.

She started her singing career at a young age by joining several singing competition in North Sumatra. She began to sing classical song when she joined Pesparawi competition, a classical singing competition, in which she won a gold medal. After that she became more interested in the classical genre and joined , an Indonesian television talent show competition as a classical singer at age 12, where she became the runner-up. At age 14 Putri Ayu was chosen as one of the winners Born to Sing Asia – David Foster contest.

She has sung in the Netherlands, Singapore, China, Australia and Timor Leste. She also has sung at international events including SEA Games, Bali Democracy Forum VI and The 12th World Chinese Entrepreneurs Convention in Chengdu, China.

Biography 
Putri Ayu Silaen was born on 24 May 1997 at Sibolga, North Sumatra to Berlin Silaen and Suzana Pangaribuan. She has two older sisters named Junita Natasya Silaen and Revina R. Silaen. She also has a brother named Putra Mahamei Parasian Silaen. She attended  in Jakarta.

Vocal ability 
Putri Ayu tends to sing as a mezzo-soprano and the highest tone she usually achieves is A5. However, in songs such as "Bohemian Rhapsody", she was able to attain a Bb5. She has achieved C#6 (soprano) when she sang The Girl in 14G.

References

External links 
 
 
 
 https://www.youtube.com/watch?v=ggu31oJb_KQ
 With Michael Bolton & David Foster https://www.youtube.com/watch?v=7Q9VaC2vcQ0
 With David Foster https://www.youtube.com/watch?v=ziyWoYYU6dU

Living people
1997 births
Indonesian Christians
21st-century Indonesian women singers
Indonesian pop singers
People of Batak descent
People from Medan